Stereotypes of South Asians are broadly believed impressions about individuals of South Asian origin that are often inconsistent with reality. While the impressions are wrongly presumed to be universally true for all people of South Asian origin, these stereotypes adversely affect the South Asians as well as the acculturation process.

With 20th century immigration of South Asians around the world, especially to the United Kingdom, Canada, and the United States, ethnic stereotyping of South Asians has become common place. These stereotypes have been found by scholars to be dehumanizing, making South Asians more prone to mistreatment and crime, a constraint on their ability to productively contribute, as well as a cause of depression and ill health.

Ethnic stereotypes of South Asians have included Orientalism and Romanticism as well as scientific racism. These stereotypes are applied in both an unrealistically ideal way and sometimes an unrealistically negative way.

Contemporary stereotypes 
South Asians are stereotyped around the world in ways that are dehumanizing, and in some cases it can lead to depression and mental health issues. Stereotypes included cultural prejudices related to the South Asian predilection for certain professions, such as medicine, engineering, and computing, or their presence in service industries as motel owners or cab drivers. As South Asians continue to assimilate, more positive perceptions prevail.

Dual socioeconomic profiling
South Asians are stereotyped as belonging to two socioeconomic groups. They are stereotyped either as convenience store or restaurant owners, cab drivers or motel operators who are uneducated, greedy, with large families and live in crowded homes. Alternatively, they are stereotyped as snobbish, upwardly mobile software programmers and doctors, who lack English-speaking fluency and are willing to take a lower salary. These stereotypes are built, claim scholars, by media shows such as the Bangladeshi store owners represented as Sirajul and Mujibur in David Letterman's show, or by the character Apu in The Simpsons, or the Babu Bhatt character on Seinfeld, or the British TV show The Kumars at No. 42 (though this may be an intentional invoking of the stereotype to call attention to it). This contrasts with the reality that South Asians are active, in various levels of prominence and service, in every profession.

Model minority

Along with East Asian people, South Asians are stereotyped as model minorities with certain expected behavior. These stereotypes are encouraged by media stories such an article by Forbes Magazine entitled "Indian Americans: The New Model Minority". Richwine claims, "The success of Indian Americans is often ascribed to the culture they bring with them, which places strong – some would even say obsessive – emphasis on academic achievement".  The article highlights how Indian American children win spelling bee contests, but the article does not mention that some Indian-American immigrant children also struggle to learn fluent English as a second language. Similarly, while Asian Indians in the United States have among the highest percentage of college degrees as well as highest income among all ethnic and racial groups, for every South Asian who has a degree with high income, there is another South Asian who struggles to gain job skills and become trained to be gainfully employed.

South Asian women 
In a 1993 study of stereotypes held by midwives in the British National Health Service, several stereotypes were found to be prevalent against women of South Asian descent. One, the South Asian mothers were stereotyped as abusing the social service and failing to take recommended treatment. Second, they were stereotyped as those who make fuss about nothing. Third, they were stereotyped as lacking 'normal maternal instinct'. The study found communication difficulties to be part of the problem, particularly among women who were Muslim South Asians with Urdu as their first language; this problem vanished when hospital staff of South Asian descent were included in the team attending the expectant mother. Further, the study found experimenter's bias in a population wide study that included native British people, people of South Asian descent and people from other parts of the world. Contrary to the stereotypes, comparative analysis revealed that the rate of health care service use, rate of diligent treatment and follow up, as well as 'maternal instinct' behavior was no different among South Asian women than natives or other ethnic groups.

Resistance to assimilation
Two conflicting but prevailing stereotypes in Europe and North America relate to alienation and assimilation by people of South Asian origins.

Hernandez, for example, in her analysis of Richard Rodriguez – the Anisfield-Wolf Book Award winner – and V.S. Naipaul – the Nobel laureate in literature of Indo-Caribbean origin – quotes Albert Memmi's classic, illustrating the stereotype. Memmi claims they make every effort to look Western, in the hope that no one will recognise them; from this proceeds their efforts to forget their past, to change their collective customs, their enthusiastic adoption of the Western language, culture and values, alleges Memmi.

Simultaneously these people are also stereotyped as old fashioned, irrational, weird in their customs, servile to their ethnic habits, lacking all sense of individuality, not eager to learn and grow, not speaking or adopting local language (for example, French or English), not wanting to assimilate and be a part of the melting pot. Some stereotype them as betraying a past, others as betraying the future. These stereotypes reflect innate discomfort, confusion and possibly a struggle with rejection by those who stereotype as well as those who are being stereotyped.

Hernandez notes, for Naipaul, after a start in a humble family background, personal and professional success could only be achieved through learning, understanding and assimilation. This conflicting stereotype is not unique to South Asians. As Hernandez outlines, the same stereotypes exist against people from different regions of the world, such as against Rodriguez of Mexico.

Historical

Komagata Maru 
In 1914, a steamer named Komagata Maru arrived in the harbor of Vancouver, Canada. On it were 376 Indians, mostly Sikhs. Both Canada and India were part of the British Commonwealth at the time, movement of people and migration within the empire was permissible, with millions of Indians sought by the British government for its World War I efforts outside India. The passengers on Komagata Maru were not soldiers but workers. The provincial government stopped the steamer at sea, refused the tired passengers from disembarking for two months, argued that the South Asians didn't belong in Canada, then forced the steamer and passengers to go back to India. Political leaders and newspaper media parroted allegations, impressions, and cartoons for two months, mocking the immigrants waiting in the boat at sea. This action has been explained by scholars, as a result of four stereotypes. First, they were stereotyped as polluting the collective character of British Columbia as a land of White, European-based settlers. Second, South Asians were stereotyped to be from an insulated and unassimilable culture. Third, they were stereotyped as those who were willing to work for less than a fair wages. Fourth, South Asians were stereotyped as unclean, diseased and a threat to public health. Robert McDonald suggests that these stereotypes were false because it was the prevalent prejudice that contributed to their segregation and difficulty in their assimilation, they did not compete with Whites for employment but took the unskilled and rough jobs for which there were no White workers available, and they were neither diseased nor unclean as wealthier Europeans families eagerly sought them as cooks and errand houseboys inside their homes. The stereotypes, claims Robert McDonald, were irrational constructions.

After being forced to go back, Komagata Maru returned to India with emotionally distraught and angry Indians. Some were arrested on arrival of the steamer in Calcutta by British officials, few shot for resisting arrest, others jumped off the ship and escaped, then joined the cause of independence of India from British rule. The Indian government in 1952, and the Canadian government in 1989 marked the Komagata Maru incident with memorials and a reminder of the dangers of discrimination and stereotypes. On May 18, 2016, Prime Minister Justin Trudeau tendered a formal "full apology" for the incident in the House of Commons.

Indomania

Friedrich Schlegel wrote in a letter to Tieck that India was the source of all languages, thoughts and poems, and that "everything" came from India. In the 18th century, Voltaire wrote that "I am convinced that everything has come down to us from the banks of the Ganges, astronomy, astrology and metempsychosis. Mark Twain similarly enthused about Indian culture and achievements.

Indophobia

The term "Indophobia" was first coined in western academia by American Indologist Thomas Trautmann to describe negative attitudes expressed by some British Indologists against Indian history, society, religions and culture. Historians have noted that during the British Empire, "evangelical influence drove British policy down a path that tended to minimize and denigrate the accomplishments of Indian civilization and to position itself as the negation of the earlier British Indomania that was nourished by belief in Indian wisdom."

In Charles Grant's highly influential "Observations on the ...Asiatic subjects of Great Britain" (1796), Grant alleged that the Hindus are "a people exceedingly depraved". Similarly, British colonial era historian, James Mill claimed that both Indians and Chinese people are cowardly, unfeeling, and mendacious. Both Mill and Grant attacked Orientalist scholarship that was too respectful of Indian culture. James Mill wrote extensively about India and on Eastern religions, even though he never once visited India. Nevertheless, James Mill was widely read, and influenced the initial impressions of South Asia in Western mind. Mill was later criticised for being prejudiced against Hindus. The Indologist H.H. Wilson wrote that the tendency of Mill's work is "evil". Such historic Indophobic literature has been suggested as a cause of dehumanizing stereotypes about South Asians.

Rebellion and miscegenation
Stereotypes of Indians intensified and changed during and after the Indian Rebellion of 1857 when some Indian sepoys and members of the native population rebelled against the British East India Company's rule in India. It has been argued that allegations of war rape were used as propaganda by British colonialists to justify the colonisation of India. While incidents of rape committed by Indian rebels against English women and girls were generally uncommon during the rebellion, this was exaggerated to great effect by the British media to justify British colonialism in the Indian subcontinent and to violently suppress opposition.

At the time, British newspapers had printed various apparently eyewitness accounts of English women and girls being raped by Indian rebels, with little corroboration to support these accounts. It was later found that some of these accounts were false stories and a few created to paint the native people of India as savages who needed to be civilised by British colonialists, a mission sometimes known as "The White Man's Burden". One such account published by The Times, regarding an incident where 48 English girls as young as 10–14 had been raped by Indian rebels in Delhi, was criticized as false propaganda by Karl Marx, who pointed out that the story was written by a clergyman in Bangalore, far from the events of the rebellion. These stereotypes and allegations were later argued as false by scholars, but they did harden the British attitude to the Indian population.

The stereotype of the Indian "dark-skinned rapist" occurred frequently in English literature of the late 19th and early 20th centuries. The idea of protecting English "female chastity" from the "lustful Indian male" had a significant influence on the policies of the British Raj to prevent racial miscegenation between the British elite and the native Indian population. While most of these discriminatory policies were directed against native Indians, some restrictive policies were also imposed on British females to "protect" them from miscegenation.

Sexual jealousy 

Indo-Caribbean people were brought to the Caribbean from various parts of India as indentured laborers for agricultural estates over a century ago. At these times they were stereotyped as being jealous for women of their ethnic origins. For example:

The shortage of Indian women resulted in violence committed by jealous lovers and husbands, creating a stereotype of East Indian men, which gained in infamy, coolies reputation with the police was bad and significantly while the Negroes use their tongue in the argument, the Indian commit murder, and given the scarcity of Indian women, without hesitation.  Thus the stereotype is reinforced ascribing to the Indian husband a frantically jealous and physically violent disposition.

Unqualified to be a judge
In 1883, the Ilbert Bill, which would have granted judges of Indian descent in Bengal the right to judge offenders irrespective of their ethnic origins including those of British descent, was opposed by the British. The opposition was based on stereotyping Indian judges as someone who could not be trusted in dealing with cases involving English women, colloquially called memsahib. The British press in India even spread wild rumours about how Indian judges would abuse their power to fill their harems with white English females, which helped raise considerable support against the bill.

The stereotype of Indian males as dark-skinned rapists lusting after white English females was challenged by several novels such as E. M. Forster's A Passage to India (1924) and Paul Scott's The Jewel in the Crown (1966), both of which involve an Indian male being wrongly accused of raping an English female. Some activists argued that these stereotypes were wrong because Indians had proven to be more receptive to women's rights and progress, with the University of Calcutta becoming one of the first universities to admit female graduates to its degree programmes in 1878, before any of the British universities.

Region-specific stereotypes

United Kingdom and English-speaking territories

Cultural stereotypes 
British sociologists Mike O'Donnell and Sue Sharpe studied British Asian students and came to similar conclusions regarding problems faced by Asian youths at lower class schools. Whereas Black British students were respected and admired by their White British peers as "macho," Asian youths had trouble gaining this same kind of respect and status. O'Donnell and Sharpe found that many Asian youths are stereotyped as weaklings, warriors or as a patriarch.

The weakling stereotype, found in the UK and English speaking territories, refers to the idea that South Asians are conformists, intelligent, lacking in athletic ability and non-confrontational.

The warrior stereotype is growing in the United Kingdom. Some Brits stereotype Sikhs as warriors and Muslims as inbred, as opposed to the rest of the South Asian community who are generally viewed as Buddhist pacifists or intellects. The Warrior stereotype has become the replacement for the Thug stereotype. During Colonial Era, South Asian criminals were referred as Thugs due to the presence of the Thuggee syndicate. The word thug originates from the syndicate and was originally used as a term for South Asian criminals. Due to the African-American hip-hop group adopting the name Thug Life, the word Thug is no longer associated with South Asian criminals. Many South Asian youths are often caricatured as rebelling against a society which stereotypes them as a model minority, as well as against their perceived strict upbringing. 

This has fed the stereotype that Pakistanis and Bangladeshis are more aggressive and form gangs. They are then further stereotyped as having poor social skills, being unable to speak to ordinary White British people and have poor listening skills.

Since post 9/11 and 7/7, South Asians Muslims (Particularly those of Bangladeshi and Pakistani origin and in many cases of Indian origin), have been stereotyped as anti-Western and/or extremists. This may have contributed to increased tensions with ethnic and religious groups in the West. In some cases even members of Hindu and Sikh community are stereotyped as terrorists in the West. This is normally due to the fact that even though the West leads in figures of literacy, the people of South Asia in particular are known to be highly informed on international issues and have more awareness of the World matters. 

Following a number of high-profile controversies about the proportion of men of South Asian heritage found to be involved in child sexual exploitation, South Asian Muslims (particularly those of Pakistani origin) have often been stereotyped as sexual groomers.

In literary studies, critics such as Homi Bhabha and Rey Chow have theorized that cultural stereotypes prevail because they work through repetition and ambivalence, easily shifting between contradictory meanings. Thus in colonial culture the 'native' or 'ethnic' is stereotyped as sly and indolent, lascivious and impotent. More recently, scholars such as Mrinalini Chakravorty have considered how contemporary fiction from and about South Asia traffics in stereotypes.

China 
Due to China's economic rivalry with India, a large number of Chinese view India negatively, with several stereotypes of Indians commonplace in Chinese culture. 

In 2012, Krish Raghav, an Indian journalist, stated that within China, the notion of India and Indian-ness is largely built on rumour and stereotype. Raghav reported that for China's online community, "India" is a combined construct of the character Rajesh Koothrappali from the sitcom Big Bang Theory, the comedian Russell Peters, images of overcrowded Indian train with people hanging off the sides, and dead bodies floating down the river Ganges. These stereotypes are frequently evoked with the descriptor, "disgusting". The smell of curry is often used as a derogatory epithet. Within the Chinese state media, there is China's official line, parroted in newspapers and TV news media, of India as a "rival"; India's woeful infrastructure is emphasised and connected to defects of democracy. Historical documentaries on China Central Television paint Indians as "soldiers of the British", lumping them together with other imperialist powers

However, many Chinese view Indian Hindus with positive attributes too due to historic connections through Buddhism and ancient cultural contact. A commonly held view is that India is rich in culture but under-developed.

Malaysia 
Currently, around 7% of Malaysia's population consists of Indians, mainly from the Tamil ethno-linguistic group of Southern India, as a minority of a largely Malay population in Peninsular Malaysia.

There are many stereotypes concerning Malaysian Indians. Some of them include that Malaysian Indians are considered as heavy drinkers and robbers. Malaysian Indians are also primely suspected of being members of Gangster or Terrorist Organisations and sometimes become victims to false accusation.

Racism still remains a major problem in Malaysia and some stereotypes have led to cases of public bullying and racially hurtful commentary, such as being called a 'Keling', 'mabuk' (drunkard) etc.

Singapore 
Around 10% of Singapore's population consists of Indians, mainly from the Tamil ethno-linguistic group of Southern India, as a minority of a largely Chinese population. There are also some 160,000 non-skilled foreigners currently working in Singapore – a majority of them are from the Indian subcontinent.

A stereotype of Singaporean Indians is that the Indian body is lacking in athleticism. They are however the richest and most successful ethnic group in Singapore, with exceptional educational attainment rates and low levels of poverty.

Racism remains a minor problem in Singapore and some stereotypes have led to cases of public bullying and racially hurtful commentary, such as being called a 'black tofu'.

Lower class foreign workers congregate in the Indian historical and now tourist enclave called Little India. Little India with its large concentration of Indians is not frequented by some Chinese Singaporeans because it is perceived as an alien space which is potentially threatening and dangerous. In 2013 a minor riot occurred in the area involving construction workers from Bangladesh, Pakistan and India, which helped fuel stereotypes of construction workers as being dangerous.

Fiji 

In Fiji, another country where large numbers of people of Indian origin were brought for agricultural plantation work, over 125 years ago, they are viewed in a manner different from some other parts of the world. Sienkiewicz finds the stereotypes popular in Pacific Islands is that Indians are too materialistic, caring only about money; that while the Indians work very hard to attain financial success, they refuse to share it. People with origins in India are also thought in Fiji to be too private and lacking a culture of caring for larger families. Indians, Sienkiewicz finds, intentionally prefer to be in nuclear families, living in isolated homes rather than communal joint families in koros (villages). Some she interviewed claimed, "Before we were in extended families, but now we are all in nuclear families. Just a small house, their family and that's it. Relatives come and they go; they do not live in that house. It is a better way of living. Everyone's needs and wants are cared for. Mostly, by having nuclear families and not living in the koro (village), we find that there is less conflict, less chance of conflict." This preference for private and diligent life is a matter of significant ethnic stereotypes and conflicts in Fiji. Sienkiewicz suggests that the British incorporation of the ethnic separation model in Fiji, while originally devised to help colonialists govern smoothly, has had long-term effects on the ethnic identities and mutual stereotypes between both Fijians and Indians in Fiji.The British had tried actively to separate and segregate the Indian and local community lest they not find among themselves the common hatred for the British which would prove fatal for them.

New Zealand
A Massey University study finds that the ethnic minority of Indian descent are stereotyped, but so are other ethnic groups. However, inter-ethnic and stereotypes-driven bullying of students of Indian descent was higher; the students of Indian descent were least likely to retaliate, report abuse to authorities or approach officials for assistance in prevention. Stereotyped and bullied Asian Indians were most likely to accept suffering, emotional trauma and ill health problems.

Negative stereotypes for Asian Indians included being presumed as unfriendly, cliquish, unemotional, weird, snobbish, uncivilized, terrorists and cheap. Many of these stereotypes did not lead to inter-ethnic bullying, but some did.

United States

Cultural prejudices in American schools
Cultural stereotypes prevalent in American schools negatively impact students of South Asian origin, in terms of social stress, feeling dehumanized and their general sense of well being. American sociologist Yvette Rosser finds that negative attitudes and images about South Asian cultures are taught in American schools or through the media, and these misconceptions may color people's personal socialization experiences. Sensationalist news stories about India often reinforce preconceived ideas.

Social studies teachers can play a critical role in eliminating cultural prejudices, but instead typically reinforce stereotypes about cultures different from their own, and present biased information about Asians, thereby losing the opportunity for deeper understanding.

In numerous interviews of students of Asian descent, as compiled by Rosser, individuals of Asian origin were asked the following questions:
Describe any stereotypes and misrepresentations about India that were taught in America as fact.
Do you feel, as a student of South Asian descent, that your presence in the classroom had an influence on the manner in which the course materials on India (or Asia in general) were presented?
If Indian and South Asian topics were presented in your classes, what ideas were emphasized?
Compare the coverage of South Asia with that of other areas of Asia.

Many Americans of South Asian origin who participated in the survey reported numerous stereotypes. Some sample stereotypes reported by Rosser, and others, include the following:

Rosser notes that the stereotypical discourse in much of the United States about South Asia is rarely devoted to economic development and democratic institutions in independent India. India is not depicted as a viable political state. People quickly make sweeping and flawed metaphysical assumptions about its respective religions and cultures, but are far more circumspect when evaluating civil society and political culture in modern India. It is as if the value of South Asia resides only in its ancient contributions to human knowledge whereas its attempts to modernize or develop are to be winked at and patronized.

After her own studies, Rosser began to question the interpretations of some of the more well-known, leftist-oriented scholars from India who dissect the nascent nation, for whatever reasons, along with their Western counterparts, regularly demonize India's national urges, deconstructing and disempowering individuals of South Asian origin. Most people stereotype South Asians as if the nation is little more than "Taj Mahal, famine, hunger, population, poverty, Hare Krishna, and Gandhi."

Alternatively, the stereotypes stress prejudices about "Hinduism, the caste system, poverty, third world country, inferiority" as if that is all India is. One survey participant confided that the diversity of views and culture within India was not depicted accurately and "only negativity was enforced; we of South Asian origin are stereotyped as that we all starve, eat monkey brains, worship rats and cows." It is as if every single individual in India is oppressed or oppressing others, it is stereotyped as a backward country that treats their women poorly and kills their baby girls. Checking for facts or reality is considered unnecessary. Similar observations have been made by other scholars, for both recent immigrants and second generation South Asian Americans born in the United States.

In the minds of many Americans, Rosser writes, Indian women are to be pitied and the positive social progress made by many women in India is completely ignored. Despite the fact that women's right to vote, other labor and civil rights in the United States took time in American history, such facts are never contextualized or compared to the social and political uplift of modern Indian women. The prevailing image is that if the unfortunate females of South Asia survive a deprived childhood they are likely to be burned in a dowry death after their forced marriage to a complete stranger. Indian women are shown as downtrodden and powerless victims, unlike American women who have more freedom. Indira Gandhi is seen as an anomaly. The numerous Indian women who every year join the colleges in America are also seen as anomalous.

Rosser notes that while India's religion and the caste system are emphasized in American discourse, no mention is made of post-independence secular India's efforts toward national integration of its minorities. No mention is made of laws and efforts against discrimination, or the country's 60-year effort towards active inclusion of scheduled caste and scheduled tribe population in educational and employment opportunities. People also forget to introspect the fact that social discrimination and prejudice has been a widespread worldwide issue, for example the treatment of African Americans in southern United States.

Outsourcing/offshoring/call centres
Barack Obama has said that the prevailing stereotype being cultivated against Indians in the United States is that "all U.S. jobs are being outsourced to India," and the stereotype is adversely affecting India–United States relations. He also commented that such stereotypes have "outlived their usefulness" and "ignore today's reality." Obama said, "Trade between our countries is not just a one-way street of American jobs and companies moving to India. It is a dynamic two-way relationship that is creating jobs, growth and higher standards in both our countries."

Consequences
Stereotypes of South Asians have been found by scholars to be dehumanizing, making them more prone to mistreatment and crime. Many of the stereotypes were created by the British who ruled and oppressed  to dehumanize the people to exert a greater control of the population. They promoted a negative view of the subcontinent and its inhabitants which unfortunately still exists to this day and has been since carried forward by the present Western Media. 

As reported in cases of other stereotyped ethnic groups, scholars also confirm the phenomenon of stereotype threat in South Asians, a psychological process that increases anxiety while reducing the potential performance of South Asians and their ability to productively contribute. The constant presence of a social or work environment filled with stereotypes has been found as a significant cause of depression and ill health.

See also
Non-resident Indian and Overseas Citizen of India
Historical definitions of races in India
Fresh off the boat
Stereotypes of Jews
Stereotypes of Americans
Ethnic stereotype
Man Like Mobeen

References

External links
South Asian stereotypes in the Vancouver press, Doreen M. Indra, Ethnic and Racial Studies Journal
They're not the same as us: midwives' stereotypes of South Asian descent maternity patients, Isobel Bowler, Sociology of Health & Illness Journal
Cultural stereotypes of women from South Asian communities: mental health care professionals' explanations for patterns of suicide and depression, J Burr, Social Science & Medicine Journal

Anti-Asian sentiment in the United States
Anti-Indian sentiment
Anti-Pakistan sentiment
South Asians
Asian-American issues
 
Anti–South Asian sentiment